Abu al-Ala Ahmad ibn al-Ala al-Amiri (d. ca. 844) was a ninth-century governor of the Yemen for the Abbasid Caliphate.

He received his appointment as resident governor from the Turkish officer Itakh, shortly after the accession of the caliph al-Wathiq (r. 842–847). Upon his arrival in the Yemen, the Yu'firid rebel Yu'fir ibn Abd al-Rahman dispatched an army to occupy the chief town of Sana'a, but local forces and the outgoing governor Mansur ibn 'Abd al-Rahman al-Tanukhi met the rebels in battle and defeated them, killing a thousand on the field and decapitating the prisoners they took. Abu al-Ala was consequently able to enter Sana'a, and he thereafter remained governor of the province until he died. His brother then assumed his functions as governor for an interim period, before Harthamah Shar Bamiyan arrived to take up the post.

Notes

References 
 
 
 

844 deaths
Year of death uncertain
9th-century people from the Abbasid Caliphate
9th-century Arabs
Abbasid governors of Yemen
9th century in Yemen